John Blennerhassett (c. 1660 – 1709) was an Anglo-Irish politician who represented various constituencies in the Irish House of Commons.

Blennerhassett was born on the family estate at Ballyseedy, County Kerry, the son of John Blennerhassett and Elisabeth Denny. He was first elected as a Member of Parliament in 1692, representing Tralee. He served as MP for Dingle between 1695 and 1699. He was subsequently MP for County Kerry between 1703 and his death in 1709.

He married Margaret Crosbie, the daughter of Patrick Crosbie and Agnes Freke, and together they had six sons and one daughter. His eldest son was the MP, John Blennerhassett.

References

1660s births
Year of birth uncertain
1709 deaths
17th-century Irish lawyers
Irish MPs 1692–1693
Irish MPs 1695–1699
Irish MPs 1703–1713
People from County Kerry
17th-century Anglo-Irish people
18th-century Anglo-Irish people
John
Members of the Parliament of Ireland (pre-1801) for County Kerry constituencies